The "Big Three" usually describes the three most prominent entities in any given grouping or subject.
It may refer to:

Arts and entertainment
 Big Three (American television), the three major traditional commercial broadcast television networks in the United States (ABC, CBS, and NBC)
 The Big Three (English band)
 The Big 3 (folk group) ,a folk trio comprising Cass Elliot, Tim Rose, and James Hendricks
 The Big Three, an R&B ensemble led by Willie Dixon
 The Big 3 (Milt Jackson album), 1975

Sports

Association football
 Big Three (Belgium), the three most successful association football clubs in Belgium
 Big Three (Costa Rica), the three most successful association football clubs in Costa Rica
 Big Three (Greece), the three most successful association football clubs in Greece
 Big Three (Netherlands), the three most successful association football clubs in the Netherlands
 Big Three (Peru), the three most successful association football clubs in Peru
 Big Three (Portugal), the three most successful association football clubs in Portugal
 Big Three (Sweden), the three most successful association football clubs in Sweden
 Big Three (Turkey), the three most successful association football clubs in Turkey

Basketball
 Big3, a professional 3-on-3 basketball league
 Big Three (Boston Celtics, 1980–1992), Larry Bird, Kevin McHale, and Robert Parish
 Big Three (Boston Celtics, 2007–2012), Kevin Garnett, Ray Allen, and Paul Pierce
 Big Three (San Antonio Spurs), Tim Duncan, Tony Parker, and Manu Ginóbili
 Big Three (Miami Heat), LeBron James, Dwyane Wade, and Chris Bosh

Other sports
 Big Three (tennis), Novak Djokovic, Rafael Nadal, and Roger Federer
 Big Three (colleges), Harvard University, Yale University, and Princeton University
 Big Three (hurling), the hurling county teams of Cork, Kilkenny, and Tipperary
 Big Three (Atlanta Braves), Tom Glavine, Greg Maddux, and John Smoltz
 Big Three (Oakland Athletics), Tim Hudson, Mark Mulder, and Barry Zito

Other uses
 Big Three (automobile manufacturers), a country's three largest automobile manufacturers
 Big Three (credit rating agencies), S&P Global, Moody's Investors Service, and Fitch Ratings
 Big Three (management consultancies), McKinsey & Company, Boston Consulting Group, and Bain & Company
 Big Three (World War II), Franklin Roosevelt, Winston Churchill, and Joseph Stalin during World War II.
 Big Three (Maine colleges), Colby-Bates-Bowdoin Consortium

See also
 Little Three